Etro is a family-managed Italian fashion house founded in 1968. It is mainly known for its paisley patterns, which the company started making in 1981.

History
Etro was founded in 1968 by Gerolamo "Gimmo" Etro as a textile design company. By the time the company was born, Gimmo and his wife, Roberta, an antiques dealer, had amassed a collection of 300 antique shawls, still one of the largest private collections in existence today. The main stylistic driver for Etro over its first decades was the paisley pattern, and variations on this theme. The company's headquarters is located in Milan on Via Spartaco, and was refurbished in 1977. The headquarters includes textile art archived in their in-house library. Future textiles head Jacopo Etro later commented on this period, stating that he had started to visit the archive when he was a child, spending many hours copying the fabric designs and experimenting with his own creative style. After a trip to India made by Etro executives, the furnishing textiles line made its debut in 1981. The "swirling" paisley design found on this trip is now "synonymous" with the label according to Elle Magazine.

The company began producing leather goods in 1984, crafted from Paisley Jacquard fabrics. Etro then began its home collection in 1985. The Fragrances collection was launched in 1989, making its debut in the Milanese Fragrances flagship boutique, located on Via Verri. More recent additions of the line include Rajasthan and Jacquard. Etro's first fashion show at Milan Fashion Week was held in 1996. The company began sales by direct-mail through inserts in The New York Times starting in 1999, and it began selling its clothing online in addition to in retail stores in 2013. In 2014, a monograph on the company's history entitled Etro was published by Rizzoli publishing house.

By 2018, Etro reported $372 million in annual revenue. By 2021, the company operated 140 flagships in 58 countries with boutiques in cities such as Milan, London, Paris, New York, Beijing and Tokyo. That year, it also took control of its South Korean business by opening a subsidiary in Seoul.

In 2021, L Catterton agreed to buy a 60% stake in Etro, in a deal valuing the company at about 500 million euros ($590 million). In 2022, Etro appointed designer Marco De Vincenzo as its new creative director for women’s, men’s and home collections, making him the brand’s first head designer from outside the Etro family.

Management

Etro is identified primarily with Gimmo (born Gerolamo), the founder, however the company is managed by his four children: 

 Kean Etro was the creative director of the Etro Man collections, sometimes inspired by his travels and antique book collection. He joined the family business in 1986 as a digital intern. In 1990 he designed his first menswear collection, and in 1996 he produced a fashion show focused on the concept of "New Tradition". 
 Veronica Etro was the creative director of the Etro Woman collections. She unveiled her first womenswear collection in 2000. 
 Jacopo Etro worked for the family business from 1982, eventually becoming the Creative Director of the Etro Accessories, Leather, Home and Textile collections, as well as Head of Communication. In 2010, he was also invited to sit on the board of the Camera Nazionale Della Moda Italiana as the delegate for the Italian textile industry. 
 Ippolito Etro joined the company in 1991, overseeing the Administration Department before his promotion to General Director. He was quoted by The New York Times stating: "My father always told us that we could do what we wanted in life. But he said, 'If you work here, you have to start from scratch'".

Collections

Menswear
The menswear collection has been presented through conceptual catwalk shows, including the 2003 Autumn/Winter collection that had guests ride on a 1937 steam train through urban Milan, with the models walking through the cabins. Other pieces have included "cooked" shirts, where the pieces are dyed with berries or other food-stuffs in order to produce their intended designs.

Womenswear
The womenswear line was launched in 1991. For the 2016 Spring/Summer womenswear collection presented in Milan, Angelo Flaccavento wrote that it "show[ed] off the savoir-faire of her ateliers", using a ballerina-lingerie theme. He wrote further of the lighter direction the collection moved in from previous seasons that "Everything had a charming, undone quality that looked appealing and felt new". The New York Times called the collection an "ode to turn-of-the-century femininity", also mentioning the strong influence of dance throughout the show. From 2017 on, Veronica and Kean started showing their collections together.

Etro Home
Starting in 1985, Etro added home textiles, pillows and plaids to its portfolio. These were followed by ceramics, gifts and wallpaper. Everything is produced in-house except for furniture. 

In 2014, Etro opened its first Etro Home store in Milan during the Salone del Mobile. In 2017, the company entered into an agreement with Jumbo Group in Cantù for the production and distribution of furniture. In 2020, Etro revealed the brand will start developing fabrics for the outdoors, to be employed in gardens or boats.

Other projects
The company also has a line of fragrances, some using the theme of "ancient perfumery". Other collections include toiletries, leathergoods, travel accessories, eyewear, footwear, and jewelry.

Controversy
In a 2018 lawsuit filed in New York State Supreme Court, former Etro employee Kim Weiner alleged the company had been discriminating against employees on the basis of race, gender and age, arguing she herself was fired after taking a stand against the company’s biased practices.

References

External links
Official Website

Italian suit makers
High fashion brands
Clothing brands of Italy
Companies based in Milan
Clothing companies established in 1968
Eyewear brands of Italy
Italian  companies established in 1968